Fu Quanxiang (3 August 1923 – 24 October 2017) was a well-known Chinese actress of Yue opera. In the Chinese press she was named as one of the ten leading female actors in Yue opera. In the view of others she was one of only two truly famous artists, the other being Yuan Xuefen.

Her repertoire included Liang Shanbo and Zhu Yingtai, The Tale of Li Wa, Du Shiniang, and others.

References 

1923 births
2017 deaths
Actresses from Shaoxing
People from Shengzhou
Yue opera actresses
Victims of the Cultural Revolution
Musicians from Shaoxing
20th-century Chinese actresses